William McDowall (c. 1749 – 3 April 1810) of Garthland and Castle Semple was a Scottish  Member of Parliament.

Life

He was the eldest son of William McDowall, Member of Parliament for Renfrewshire from 1768 to 1774, and Elizabeth Graham. His youngest brother, David McDowall-Grant, was also briefly a Member of Parliament for Banffshire.

He was educated at Glasgow University, matriculating in 1761, and admitted as an advocate in 1771.

He sat as Member of Parliament for Renfrewshire from 1783 until 1786, for Ayrshire from 1789 until 1790, for Glasgow Burghs from 1790 to 1802, and again for Renfrewshire from 1802 until 1810.

He owned property in Grenada and St Kitts as well as extensive lands in west-central Scotland which he bequeathed in trust to his nephew William McDowall (1770-1840), son of his brother James.

He was a partner in the firm of Alexander Houston & Co., a major Glasgow firm trading in the West Indies, which failed in 1801.

He was Lord Lieutenant of Renfrewshire from 1794 until his death, and Rector of Glasgow University from 1795 to 1797.

Family

His younger brother James McDowall was twice Lord Provost of Glasgow.

References

1740s births
1810 deaths
Alumni of the University of Glasgow
18th-century Scottish people
Members of the Parliament of Great Britain for Scottish constituencies
British MPs 1780–1784
British MPs 1784–1790
British MPs 1790–1796
British MPs 1796–1800
Members of the Parliament of the United Kingdom for Scottish constituencies
UK MPs 1801–1802
UK MPs 1802–1806
UK MPs 1806–1807
UK MPs 1807–1812
Lord-Lieutenants of Renfrewshire
Rectors of the University of Glasgow